This is a list of films produced or filmed in Luxembourg, including numerous films made for television in the country. Many of them may have been co-produced with Germany, France or Belgium.

A

An American Werewolf in Paris (1997)

B
Baby(a)lone (2015)
Babysitting (2001) 
Back in Trouble (1997) 
Le Bal des pantins (2001) 
Barrage (2017)
Belgique - le charme de l'Ardenne (1922)
La Belle et la bête (1946) 
Benjamin Blümchen (1997) 
Bernadette (1988) 
Biouel (1996) 
Black Dju (1996)
Blind Spot (2012)
Blut in der Spur (1979) 
Bob's Beach (2003) (TV) 
Bracia (2005) 
Brudermord (2005) 
Butterflies (2005/I) 
Bye Bye Blackbird (2005)

C
Call Her Madam (1998) (V) 
Calvaire (2004) 
Cargo, les hommes perdus. (2007)
Caught in the Act (2004) (TV) 
La Chambre obscure (2000) 
Chasseurs de dragons (2008)
Christie Malry's Own Double-Entry (2000)
Le Club des chômeurs (2001) 
Comme tout le monde (2006) 
Comme t'y es belle! (2006) 
Confessions of an Ugly Stepsister (2002) (TV) 
 (2002) 
CQ (2001)

D
Deepfrozen (2006) 
Déi zwéi vum Bierg (1985)
Dog Soldiers (2002) 
Du poil sous les roses (2000)

E
Ech war am Congo 
L'École de la chair (1998) 
Edelweißpiraten (2004) 
Edward J. Steichen (1995) 
Elegant (2006) 
Elenya (1992) 
Elles (1997) 
The Emperor's Wife (2003) 
The Enemy (2001/I) 
Erè mèla mèla (2001)
Eros (2004) 
Etre et Vivre Avec (2007)  
Expo 150 - De film (1989) 
Extreme Ops (2002)

F
Falling Through (2000) 
Fast Film (2003) 
FeardotCom (2002)
La Femme de Gilles (2004)
Les Feux follets (2003) 
Le Fils du requin (1993) 
Flawless (2009)
Flitze Feuerzahn (1997)  
Fortress 2 (1999) 
Les Fourmis rouges (2007)
Fragile (1998) 
La Freccia azzurra (1996) 
Freigesprochen (2007)

G
Les Gens qui s'aiment(2000) 
Girl with a Pearl Earring (2003) 
Globi und der Schattenräuber (2003) 
A Good Woman (2004) 
Goodbye Bafana (2007) 
Gwyncilla: Legend of Dark Ages (1986)

H
The Headsman (2005) 
Heemwei - Eng  Odyssee (2014)Heim ins Reich - Wéi Lëtzebuerg sollt preisesch ginn (2004) Here Come the Littles (1985) Histoire(s) de jeunesse(s) (2001) Hochzaeitsnuecht (1992) L'Homme au cigare (2003)  The Hound of London (1993) (TV) A House in the Hills (1993)  House of Boys (2007) Hurensohn (2004)

IIce Cream Sundae (2001) Il est un petit pays (1937) Im Anfang war der Blick (2002)In a Dark Place (2006) Irina Palm (2007) Isabelle (1998)  Isegrim & Reineke (2004) (TV) Istanbul (1985)

JJ'ai toujours voulu être une sainte (2003)Jaime (1999) J'aurais voulu être un danseur (2007) Je pense à vous (1992) La Jungle (2006)

KKirikou et la sorcière (1998)Kruistocht in spijkerbroek (2006)

L (2006) Lilacs (2007) The Lodge (2004)Lorenz im Land der Lügner (1997) Love and Virtue (2008) Luc et Marie (1995)Lumen (2007)

MMadame Edouard (2004) Maigret et le fou de Sainte Clotilde (2002) (TV) Massacre pour une orgie (1966)Masz na imie Justine (2005) Match Point (2005)  Max et Bobo (1998) Mécanomagie (1996)The Merchant of Venice (2004)Midnight Man (1995) (TV) Minotaur (2006) Miss Montigny (2005) Mon nom est femme (1968) Mondo veneziano (2005) Moonlight (2002) More (1969) The Musketeer (2001)

NNebel (2000) The Nebula Dawn (2006) Der Neunte Tag (2004) Never Die Young (2013)New World Disorder (1999) Nha fala (2002) Nightworld: Lost Souls (1998) (TV) No Star (2006) Noces (2016) - See A Wedding (at the section "W")Nue propriété (2006) Nuits d'Arabie (2007)

OOctane (2003) On Dangerous Ground (1996) (TV) On ferme! (1999) One Against the Wind (1991) (TV)

PPano ne passera pas (1969)Les Perdants n'écrivent pas l'histoire (2001) Perl oder Pica (2006)Petites misères (2002) Pierre Molinier, 7 rue des Faussets (1976) The Pillow Book (1996)  (2004) The Plot Spoiler (2006) The Point Men (2001) Le Pont rouge (1991) Portrait d'artiste: Charles Kohl (1998) Pourquoi se marier le jour de la fin du monde? (2000) La Promesse (1996)

QQuatrième palier (1999)

RRag Tale (2005)Réfractaire (2008)Die Reise das Land (1987) Renaissance (2006) Rencontre avec le dragon (2003) Rendolepsis (2003) Retour à Gorée (2007)Retrato de Família (1992) Retrograde (2004) La Revanche (2004) The Ride (2002) River Tales (2020)Roger (1996) Le Roman de Renart (2005)

SSalut cousin! (1996) Save Angel Hope (2007) Schacko Klak (1989) Schmol (2004) Secret Passage (2004) Das Sein und das Nichts (2007) Les Sept péchés capitaux (1992)  Le Serpent a mangé la grenouille (1998) Something About Pizza (2005) Starfly (2005) Sub Down (1997) Superstition (2001)

TTale of the Mummy (1998) Le Tango des Rashevski (2003) T'Choupi (2004) The Tell Tale Heart (2005)  (2004) Tempo (2003) Terre rouge (1989) The Thief Lord (2006) Three (2005)  (1993)Tour de force (2005) Tristan et Iseut (2002) Troublemaker (1988) The Tulse Luper Suitcases, Part 1: The Moab Story (2003) Turandot at the Forbidden City of Beijing (1999) (TV) De Tweeling (2002)

UUne liaison pornographique (1999)

VLe Ventre de Juliette (2003) Verrouillage central (2001) Victims (2007) Villa des Roses (2002) Visions of Europe (2004)Voices from Chernobyl (2016)

WW (2003)  A Wedding (Noces in French) (2016) - A co-production with Belgium, France, and PakistanWho's Quentin? (2005) Wing Commander (1999) (1984) 

YYa Rayah (2000) Yoon (2007) Your Chicken Died of Hunger'' (2002)

References

External links
 Luxembourgish film at the Internet Movie Database

Luxembourg

Films